Blackwater Creek (Sunderland) Aerodrome  is a registered aerodrome located  southwest of Sunderland, Ontario, Canada.

References

Registered aerodromes in Ontario